The Colorado Classic is a four-stage cycling race that was first held in 2017. First organized with both men's and women's races, the men's race was discontinued after the 2018 edition; the Classic continues as a women-only event. The men's version of the race was designated as 2.HC and was part of the UCI America Tour. In 2018, the first two stages were in Vail (August 16–17) and the last two were in Denver (August 18–19). The Denver stages were accompanied by a music and cycling fan fest extravaganza called Velorama.

In December 2018, the organizers announced that the Classic would become a women-only race from 2019 forward. As part of the change, the women's purse was increased from $20,000 in 2018 to $75,000 for 2019—which was $5,000 more than the purse for the final men's Classic in 2018. The Classic became the only standalone women's stage race in the Western Hemisphere included in the official UCI calendar; the 2019 edition was the first to be part of USA Cycling's Pro Road Tour  and is classified as a 2.1 race by the UCI.  The 2020 edition was canceled due to the COVID-19 pandemic.

Winners - Men

Winners - Women

See also 
Coors Classic, Colorado cycling race held in 1980–1988
USA Pro Cycling Challenge, Colorado cycling race held in 2011–2015

References

External links
Official site

Cycle races in the United States
Recurring sporting events established in 2017
2017 establishments in Colorado
Cycling in Colorado
UCI America Tour races